Minister of Families of Quebec is responsible for families and seniors in the province.

The office is currently held by Suzanne Roy.

References

External links
Official site

Families, Seniors and the Status of Women
Quebec, Families, Seniors and the Status of Women
Quebec, Families, Seniors and the Status of Women
Women in Quebec